Karl Geldner (6 July 1927 – 7 January 2017) was a German politician of the Free Democratic Party (FDP) and former member of the German Bundestag.

Life 
He was a member of the German Bundestag from the 1965 to 1969 federal elections and from 26 January 1970, when he succeeded the late Albrecht Haas, until 1976. He had entered the parliament via the state list of the FDP Bavaria.

Literature

References

1927 births
2017 deaths
Members of the Bundestag for Bavaria
Members of the Bundestag 1972–1976
Members of the Bundestag 1969–1972
Members of the Bundestag 1965–1969
Members of the Bundestag for the Free Democratic Party (Germany)